Euprepius may refer to:

Euprepius of Egypt, 4th-century Christian monk in Egypt
Euprepius of Verona, 1st and 2nd-century bishop

See also
 Euprepis